The James Smithson Medal, established in 1965, is awarded to those who have made "exceptional contributions to art, science, history, education and technology." It is presented by the Smithsonian Institution which states that it is the organization's "most prestigious and highest award."

Recipients

References

Awards established in 1965
Smithsonian Institution
1965 establishments in the United States